House of Highlights (often abbreviated as HoH) is a social media network that focuses on the distribution of videos online. HoH is headquartered in New York City within Bleacher Report’s office. Known primarily for popular sport highlights, HoH has positioned itself as a distributor in the sport media industry, but also in the short video clip industry. In 2019, the National Basketball Association experienced rapid popularity growth in social media, increasing the popularity of HoH, as they were known to create videos about basketball. The House of Highlights videos range from 30 second or less clips, or 2-10 minute long videos that are often highlights of a recent NBA game or post game interviews of a popular player. 

Since being acquired by Bleacher Report in December 2016, House of Highlights has expanded into a multi-platform media business with over 24 million followers across Instagram, YouTube, and TikTok. According to Bleacher Report, House of Highlights accounted for 10% of Bleacher Report’s total revenue as of June 2019.

History

Founding: 2014-2016 
The company was founded by Omar Raja in his college dorm room at the University of Central Florida in the summer of 2014. The company started when he wanted to relive and share memorable moments of LeBron James and the Miami Heat after the NBA star left the Miami Heat to return to the Cleveland Cavaliers that same summer. Raja then started an Instagram account called “The Highlight Factory”, but eventually changed the name to “House of Highlights”.

Bleacher Report Acquisition: 2015 - Present 
House of Highlights had gained about half a million followers on Instagram by the time the account caught the eye of Doug Bernstein, then the vice-president of social media at Bleacher Report, who expressed interest in the brand in July 2015. After a year and a half later, Bleacher Report officially acquired House of Highlights in December 2016. While under Bleacher Report, House of Highlights started to see increased traffic and viewership as reported by Esquire that HoH would get about 700 million video views a month during the NBA season, with 10,000 new followers daily. In 2016, House of Highlights struck its initial brand partnership deals with the companies such as Lexus, Nike, Jordan Brand, Adidas and Netflix. An early brand partnership with Under Armour had the brand create “The Curry Challenge” where they posted clips of ordinary people trying to imitate Stephen Curry’s signature pre-game basketball moves that went viral. As the company’s followers rose on Instagram and continued to build partnerships with brands such as these, HoH eventually caught the attention of the fast food chain, Taco Bell. AdAge outlined how Taco Bell will sponsor HoH stories on Instagram during the NBA season, to target the company’s young audience.

As reported by Billboard, House of Highlights was a platform for the viral 2016 dance craze the Running Man Challenge, the Drive By Dunk Challenge, and “Hoodie Melo” in which HoH posted clips of Carmelo Anthony working out in a hoodie, which soon became a viral meme with the nickname "Hoodie Melo", which expanded to a clothing brand.

In January 2018, HoH expanded the business and created its own YouTube channel. The channel shares NBA highlights, player recaps, basketball podcasts, House of Highlights original content and other viral clips. The HoH original content series titled “The Reel”  gives viewers the opportunity to get a candid reaction from star athletes as they relive and break down the most iconic plays of their careers.

In October 2018, the company partnered with Twitter to launch “House of Highlights LIVE”, a recurring live show built for the Gen-Z audience and featuring athletes and entertainers. In effort to improve the brand’s presence across social media, HoH is hoping that the Twitter show will help increase the following on the platform.

In April 2019, Twitter ordered a second season of “House of Highlights LIVE” with a new focus on activating before huge live sporting events including NBA Opening Night, All Star Weekend, and College Football Rivalry Week.

In addition to this, the company conducted its first basketball camp in 2019, that was free for 150 kids. Eben Novy-Williams of Bloomberg, describes how the company’s goal is to build a stronger affiliation with its audience and share memorable experiences with them through live events. The following year, during the NBA All-Star Weekend, House of Highlights put on its second basketball camp for young athletes. The Chicago Tribune was on location and explained how Chicago Bulls star Coby White felt like a kid again as he helped teach the young campers new skills on the court.

Earlier in 2020, it was announced that Raja would be leaving House of Highlights at the end of his contract and join ESPN.

Later In 2020, HoH expanded its content offering into live original programming by launching “HoH Showdown”, a creator-led series combining some of the internet’s biggest creators with engaging live competition formats aiming to redefine ‘appointment viewing’ for Gen-Z fans. The first HoH Showdown brought together Kris London, Jesser, Tristan Jass and MMG for a closest-to-the-pin golf challenge with $100K on the line. With an audience that skews younger, around the age of 13-24, the first edition of The Showdown brought a new and fresh way to experience the game of golf through influencers they heavily gravitate towards. This competition brought in 200,000 concurrent viewers and 576,000 views with and average watch time of 12 minutes on YouTube. Following the success of the first edition, the company looks to plans the HoH Showdown into a reoccurring sporting event that will put the popular social media influencers against each other in various sports/competition challenges.  Some of the talent who have competed in the HoH Showdown include, Mark Phillips (@SupremeDreams_1), Kenny Beecham (@kot4q), Duke Dennis, MMG, Agent00, Jenna Bandy and Jack Settleman.

Recognition  
Since 2018, House of Highlights has been nominated and awarded for the brand's success across social media ranging from its use of Instagram, presence on Instagram and collaborative brand sponsorship campaigns.

Shorty Awards

 2019 "Instagram Presence" - Nomination

Cynopsis Sports Media Awards

 2018 “Use of Instagram" - Winner
 2020 “Use of Instagram” - Finalist

Clios Sports Award

 Silver for Social Media - Multi-Platform Campaign

References 

2014 establishments in New York City
Mass media in New York City
Sports in New York City
Sports mass media in the United States
Turner Sports